Harold Woodcock (18 September 1928 – 31 March 2003), commonly known as Harry Woodcock, was an English footballer who played for Darlington in the Football League.

Life and career
Woodcock was born in Darlington, County Durham, and joined his hometown club, Darlington F.C. of the Football League Third Division North, in August 1952. He made his debut during the 1952–53 season, and made five League appearances in total, including at right half against Wrexham in March 1953 and at inside right against York City in January 1954, but played mostly for the reserve team in the North-Eastern League. In December 1953, he scored four times, including a first-half hat-trick, as Darlington Reserves won 6–3 away to Ashington. He was still on Darlington's books in 1954–55, but was loaned to North-Eastern League club Blackhall Colliery Welfare in November 1954; he made a "pleasing debut" playing at left half against Stockton, and also appeared at centre half. Woodcock died in Darlington at the age of 74.

References

1928 births
2003 deaths
Footballers from Darlington
English footballers
Association football wing halves
Association football inside forwards
Darlington F.C. players
Blackhall Colliery Welfare F.C. players
English Football League players